Mircea Monroe is an American actress. She is known for her roles on the TV series Episodes as Morning Randolph (2011–2017), Hart of Dixie as Tansy Truitt (2011–2015), Impastor as Alexa Cummings (2015–2016) and Sing It! as Stacey Needles (2016). She has also performed in films including Cellular (2004), House of the Dead 2 (2005), Just Friends (2005), The Change-Up (2011) and Magic Mike (2012).

Life and career
Monroe was born in St. Louis, Missouri. Her first name Mircea is a traditionally male given name in Romania. She says her father chose the name to honor his favorite professor, Mircea Eliade, with whom he studied History of the Religions at the University of Chicago. She lives with her long-term partner, English actor Stephen Merchant, in Nichols Canyon, Los Angeles.

Her first professional acting job was in the New Line film, Cellular. Since then, Monroe has appeared in various films, and pilots for The WB and Fox, starred in the Fox show Drive, and guest starred on TV shows, including Freddie, Scrubs, and Studio 60 on the Sunset Strip. Monroe appeared in the starring role of the film The 41-Year-Old Virgin Who Knocked Up Sarah Marshall and Felt Superbad About It, playing Sarah Marshall. She also appeared as Veronique in the horror film The Black Waters of Echo's Pond.

Monroe was featured in the September 2004 issue of Maxim and on the cover of Yoga magazine's August 2014 issue.

She had a regular role on the Showtime series Episodes.

Personal life
In December 2018, it was reported that Monroe was dating English comedian and actor Stephen Merchant.

Filmography

Film

Television

Web

References

External links
 

American film actresses
American television actresses
Living people
Actresses from St. Louis
21st-century American actresses
Female models from Missouri
Year of birth missing (living people)